Fana is a former municipality in the old Hordaland county in Norway. The municipality was located in the central part of the Bergen Peninsula, south of the city of Bergen. The administrative centre of the municipality was the village of Nesttun. The roughly  municipality existed from 1838 until 1972 when it had 44,402 residents, making it one of the most populous municipalities in the nation.  The area of the former municipality encompassed the southern half of the present-day Bergen Municipality in Vestland county, it specifically included the present-day boroughs of Fyllingsdalen, Ytrebygda, and Fana, as well as the southern part of the borough of Årstad.

The historic Fana Church was the main church for the municipality.

History

The parish of "Fane" was established as a formannskapsdistrikt, the predecessor of today's municipalities ("kommune"), on 1 January 1838.  The spelling was later changed to "Fana".  In 1879, a small area of Fana (population: 18) was transferred to the Laksevåg area of the neighboring Askøy Municipality. 

This gave the city a lot of room to grow. On 1 January 1966, another small border adjustment took place: a small part of Fana located along the lake Ortuvatnet in Fyllingsdalen (population: 4) was transferred to the city of Bergen.

On 1 January 1972, the municipality of Fana (population: 44,402) was merged into the city of Bergen in addition to the other neighboring municipalities of Arna, Laksevåg, and Åsane, forming a much larger city-municipality of Bergen.

Municipal council
The municipal council  of Laksevåg was made up of 53 representatives that were elected to four year terms.  The party breakdown of the final municipal council was as follows:

See also
List of former municipalities of Norway

References

Geography of Bergen
Former municipalities of Norway
1838 establishments in Norway
1972 disestablishments in Norway